Enramycin (also knownb as enduracidin) is a polypeptide antibiotic produced by Streptomyces fungicidus. Enramycin is widely used as a feed additive for pigs and chickens to prevent necrotic enteritis induced by Gram-positive gut pathogens.

Mechanism of action 
Enramycin acts as an inhibitor of the enzyme MurG, which is essential for cell wall biosynthesis in Gram-positive bacteria. MurG catalyzes the transglycosylation reaction in the last step of peptidoglycan biosynthesis. Inhibiting this step greatly compromises cell wall integrity leading to cell lysis.

Spectrum of susceptibility 
Enramycin has been found to be very effective against Gram-positive gut pathogens, most notably, Clostridium perfringens; a leading cause of necrotic enteritis. The following represents MIC data for a couple of veterinary pathogens.
 Clostridium perfringens: 0.05 μg/ml – 1.6 μg/ml
 Staphylococcus aureus: 0.013 μg/ml – 0.413 μg/ml

Composition 
Standard grade enramycin is composed of two main components called enramycin A and enramycin B. These two components are routinely used as analytical reference standards; however, their activity as individual compounds does not appear to be widely studied or characterized.

References 

Polypeptide antibiotics
Veterinary drugs